may refer to:

Fictional characters
Akuma, the race that the members of the heavy metal band Seikima-II portray
Akuma, the villain in Karateka (video game)
Akuma, demonic army in D.Gray-man media
Akuma, demon people in the Kindred of the East universe
Akuma, leader of the Akki Monks in The Hollow (TV series)
Akuma (NX Files), an evil demon spirit in the NX Files universe
Akuma (Street Fighter), a character in Street Fighter media
Akuma Shogun, the main villain of the Golden Mask Arc in Kinnikuman media
Akuma-kun, a manga series by Shigeru Mizuki, and an animated TV series by Toei Animation
Akuma-kun: Makai no Wana, a video game based upon the above 
Akuma, a type of butterfly used to possess people in the animated series Miraculous: Tales of Ladybug & Cat Noir

People
Akuma (luchador), (born 1994), Mexican professional wrestler
Gran Akuma (born 1979), American professional wrestler
AKUMA (Ethan Kinsley), (born 2006), model and content creator

Other
Akuma (folklore), an evil spirit from Japanese folklore
Akuma (band), a punk band from Quebec, Canada